U4/U6.U5 tri-snRNP-associated protein 2 is a protein that in humans is encoded by the USP39 gene.

References

Further reading